The following persons are, or were, the president of Mississippi State University.

Presidents of Mississippi A&M (1880–1932)

Presidents of Mississippi State College (1932–1958)

Presidents of Mississippi State University (1958–present)

Notes

References

External links
 Office of the President

 
Mississippi State University
Mississippi State University, Presidents